Chesterton may refer to:
Chesterton, Cambridge, a suburb of north-east Cambridge, England
Chesterton, Huntingdonshire, a village historically separate but now in the far west of Cambridgeshire, England